Euclasta bacescui is a moth in the family Crambidae. It was described by Popescu-Gorj and Constantinescu in 1977. It is found in South Africa.

References

Endemic moths of South Africa
Moths described in 1977
Pyraustinae